This is a list of Belgian television related events from 1984.

Events
2 March - Jacques Zegers is selected to represent Belgium at the 1984 Eurovision Song Contest with his song "Avanti la vie". He is selected to be the twenty-ninth Belgian Eurovision entry during Eurosong held at the RTBF Studios in Brussels.

Debuts

Television shows

1980s
Tik Tak (1981-1991)

Ending this year

Births
13 February - Sean Dhondt, TV & radio host
20 February - Sofie Van Moll, actress & TV & radio host
11 June - Kobe Van Herwegen, actor, TV host & magician
3 July - Sandrine Van Handenhoven, singer & TV host

Deaths